Pausha, also called Paush, Poush, Pausa or Pushya, is the tenth month of the Hindu calendar, corresponding with December/January of the Gregorian calendar. In the Indian national calendar, Pausha is also the tenth month of the year, beginning on 21 December and ending on 19 January.

In the Hindu lunisolar calendar, Pausha begins with either the full or new moon around the same time of year. Since the traditional Hindu calendar follows the lunar cycle, Pausha's start and end dates vary from year to year, unlike the months of the Hindu solar calendars. Pausha is a winter (Hemanta and Shishira Ritu) month. The lunar month of Pausha overlaps with the solar month of Dhanu.

Events
Pausa Bahula Amavasya day is celebrated as Theppotsavam (float festival) at Sri Varaha Lakshmi Narasimha Swamyvari Temple in Simhachalam. The Utsava idols are taken in a palanquin to Varaha Pushkarini.

See also

 Astronomical basis of the Hindu calendar
Hindu units of measurement
 Hindu astrology
 Indian astronomy

References

10